Reg Wiebe (born January 23, 1963, Canada - died December 20, 2018, Winnipeg) was a Dutch Canadian-born curler and curling coach from the Curling Club Utrecht. In a middle of 2000s he was a skip of the Dutch national team. Wiebe has played in six European Curling Championships, including a 10th-place finish in the 1999 Championships as a third for Wim Neeleman. Wiebe has skipped the Dutch team to three European championships. In 2002 they finished 12th, in 2005 they finished 19th, and in 2007 they finished 17th.

Teams

Record as a coach of national teams

References

External links

1963 births
2018 deaths
Dutch male curlers
Dutch curling coaches
Canadian Mennonites
Dutch Mennonites